was the twelfth shōgun of the Ashikaga shogunate from 1521 through 1546 during the late Muromachi period of Japan. He was the son of the eleventh shōgun Ashikaga Yoshizumi. His childhood name was Kameomaru (亀王丸). On 1 May 1521, after Shogun Ashikaga Yoshitane and Hosokawa Takakuni struggled for power over the shogunate and Yoshitane withdrew to Awaji Island, the way was clear for Minamoto-no Yoshiharu to be installed as shogun as he enters Kyoto.

Not having any political power and repeatedly being forced out of the capital of Kyoto, Yoshiharu retired in 1546 over a political struggle between Miyoshi Nagayoshi and Hosokawa Harumoto making his son Ashikaga Yoshiteru the thirteenth shogun. He dies on 20 May 1550. Later in 1568, supported by Oda Nobunaga, his son Ashikaga Yoshiaki became the fifteenth shogun.

From a western perspective, Yoshiharu is significant, as he was shogun when the first contact of Japan with the European West took place in 1543. A Portuguese ship, blown off its course to China, landed in Japan. In 1526, Yoshiharu invited archers from neighboring provinces to come to the capital for an archery contest.

Events of Yoshiharu's bakufu
Significant events shape the period during which Yoshiharu was shōgun:
 1521 – Hosokawa Takakuni has Yoshiharu appointed shōgun.
 1526 – Kasai rebels, Miyoshi rebels: Go-Nara succeeds.
 1528 – Yoshiharu driven out by Miyoshi Nagamoto.
 1533 – Ikkō rebellion.
 1536 – Go-Nara enthroned.
 1538 – Dissension in Koga Kubō's family.
 1546 – Yoshiharu flees to Ōmi; his son, Yoshiteru, appointed shōgun in exile.

Family 
 Father: Ashikaga Yoshizumi
 Mother: Hino Akiko
 Wife: Keijuin (1514–1565)
 Concubines:
 Oodate Tsuneoki's daughter
 Children:
 Ashikaga Yoshiaki by Keijuin
 Ashikaga Yoshiteru by Keijuin
 Ashikaga Shuko (d. 1565)
 Shiratori Yoshihisa (d. 1547)
 daughter married Takeda Yoshimune
 daughter married Miyoshi Yoshitsugu
 daughter married Karasume Kosen
 Nun in Hyokoji temple

Eras of Yoshiharu's bakufu
The years in which Yoshiharu was shōgun are more specifically identified by more than one era name or nengō.
 Daiei (1521–1528)
 Kyōroku (1528–1532)
 Tenbun (1532–1555)

Notes

References
 Ackroyd, Joyce. (1982) Lessons from History: The Tokushi Yoron. Brisbane: University of Queensland Press.  ;  OCLC 7574544
 Titsingh, Isaac. (1834). Nihon Ōdai Ichiran; ou,  Annales des empereurs du Japon.  Paris: Royal Asiatic Society, Oriental Translation Fund of Great Britain and Ireland. OCLC 585069

1511 births
1550 deaths
16th-century shōguns
Ashikaga shōguns
Ashikaga clan